Kasiyarovo (Qasiyar) is a rural locality (a village) in Tazlarovsky Selsoviet, Burayevsky District, Bashkortostan, Russia. The population was 191 as of 2010. There are six streets.

Geography 
Kasiyarovo is located 22 km northeast of Burayevo (the district's administrative centre) by road. Starotazlarovo is the nearest rural locality.

References 

Rural localities in Burayevsky District